Trump Takes on the World is a 2021 BBC Two documentary series about the foreign policy of the former President of the United States, Donald Trump.

Synopsis
The three-part series focuses on Trump's foreign policy regarding Europe, the Middle East, and East Asia. It includes interviews with members of the administration including Thomas Shannon and K. T. McFarland, as well as foreign leaders such as prime minister of Australia Malcolm Turnbull and President of France François Hollande.

Reception
Anita Singh of The Daily Telegraph rated the series four stars out of five. Ed Cumming of The Independent gave it five stars out of five, praising the quality of the interviewees; Alison Howatt of The Herald believed that the interviewees illuminated incidents that would be well known to viewers. Commentator Iain Dale considered the series to be factual and not agenda-driven.

The series was nominated for the Best Current Affairs at the 2022 British Academy Television Awards.

References

Media about the Trump presidency
2021 British television series debuts
2021 British television series endings
BBC television documentaries